Inherent powers are powers held by a sovereign state. In the United States, the President derives these powers from the loosely worded statements in the Constitution that "the executive Power shall be vested in a President" and the president should "take care that the laws be faithfully executed" (defined in practice, rather than by constitutional or statutory law).

In re Debs, 158 U.S. 564 (1896)[1] was a Supreme Court decision involving Eugene V. Debs and labor unions. Debs (president of the American Railway Union) was involved in the Pullman Strike earlier in 1894, and challenged the federal injunction ordering the strikers back to work. The injunction had been issued because of the hindrance to transportation of U.S. Mail. However, Debs refused to end the strike and was cited for contempt of court; he appealed the decision to the courts. The main question being debated was whether the President had a right to issue the injunction, which dealt with both interstate and intrastate commerce and shipping on rail cars. The legislative branch had never delegated to the President the power to issue an injunction. However, in a unanimous decision written by Justice David Josiah Brewer, the court ruled in favor of the U.S. government. Joined by Chief Justice Melville Fuller and Associate Justices Stephen Johnson Field, John Marshall Harlan, Horace Gray, Henry Billings Brown, George Shiras, Jr., Howell Edmunds Jackson and Edward Douglass White, the court ruled that the government had a right to regulate interstate commerce and ensure the operations of the Postal Service, along with a responsibility to "ensure the general welfare of the public." 

The constitution is interpreted by the government and the people. However, the limits of inherent powers were articulated in Youngstown Sheet & Tube Co. v. Sawyer, 343 U.S. 579 (1952)[1]. This case was a Supreme Court decision limiting the power of the president to seize private property in the absence of either specifically enumerated authority under Article Two of the United States Constitution or statutory authority conferred on him by Congress. However, Justice Black's majority decision was qualified by separate concurring opinions of five other members of the Court; this made it difficult to determine the details and limits of the president's power to seize private property in emergencies. Justice Jackson's concurring opinion provided three categories to be considered:
Congress approves (express or implied)
Congress disapproves (express or implied)
Congress does nothing (which can invite judicial consideration of the president's actions)

See also
Contempt of Congress

Legal doctrines and principles